Hải Hậu is a rural district of Nam Định province in the Red River Delta region of Vietnam. As of 2003 the district had a population of 285,298. The district covers an area of 227 km². The district capital lies at Yên Định.

Administrative divisions 
Hải Hậu is divided into 34 commune-level subdivisions, including 3 townships of Yên Định, Cồn, Thịnh Long and 31 rural communes of Hải An, Hải Anh, Hải Bắc, Hải Châu, Hải Chính, Hải Cường, Hải Đông, Hải Đường, Hải Giang, Hải Hà, Hải Hòa, Hải Hưng, Hải Lộc, Hải Long, Hải Lý, Hải Minh, Hải Nam, Hải Ninh, Hải Phong, Hải Phú, Hải Phúc, Hải Phương, Hải Quang, Hải Sơn, Hải Tân, Hải Tây, Hải Thanh, Hải Triều, Hải Trung, Hải Vân, & Hải Xuân.

References

Districts of Nam Định province